Avenida Jiménez is a transfer station, part of the TransMilenio mass-transit system of Bogotá, Colombia.

Location
The station is located in the heart of downtown Bogotá, specifically at the intersection of Avenida Jiménez with Avenida Caracas.

History 

The station entered operation on December 17, 2000 as part of the original Transmilenio system, only to be closed a year later for construction of the Eje Ambiental, which was opened in 2002.

After the opening of the Jiménez-Calle 13 trunk, the station was converted from a simple station into an interchange between the aforementioned trunk and Avenida Caracas with five platforms. The station serves an average of 500,000 passengers per day.

The station has three entrances: one on Avenida Caracas with Calle 11, another on Avenida Jiménez with Carrera 12, and one on the south-east intersection of Avenida Caracas with Avenida Jiménez, which has access to the underground foot tunnel.

It serves the La Capuchina, Santa Inés, and San Victorino neighborhoods.

This station has a "Punto de Encuentro" or point of gathering, which has bathrooms, coffeeshop, parking for bicycles and a tourist attention booth.

After the inauguration of the trunk Jiménez-Calle 13, what was a simple station became a station of exchange between that trunk with the one of the Caracas Avenue with 5 wagons in service. As such the station has a full attendance of 500,000 daily users on average.

Together with the Ricaurte and Universidades-Las Aguas stations, it is one of three transfer stations of TransMilenio.

On August 29, during the national agrarian strike in Colombia, attacks against this station of the system were recorded on the wagons corresponding to Avenida Jiménez with Carrera 12, Leaving multiple damages and material losses. However, the next day the station was running normally with new infrastructure.

On May 1, 2015, during the marches of International Workers Day, a new attack against this station was registered, in the same wagons of Carrera 12 with the avenue Jiménez, where 16 people were injured and a loss of 5 million pesos caused.

Station services

Old trunk services/Caracas

Old trunk services/Américas

Main line service/Caracas

Main line service/Américas

Feeder routes
This station does not have connections to feeder routes.

Inter-city service
This station does not have inter-city service.

See also
 List of TransMilenio Stations

TransMilenio